Rodrigo Eduardo Tapia Contreras (born 13 March 1988) is a Chilean former footballer who played as a forward.

Club career
Tapia made his debut with Colo-Colo in 2006, appearing in three games and scoring one goal.  He represented the Chile national team at the U-17 level in 2005.

In the 2006 Clasura Tournament 2006 quarterfinals, Tapia along with many other youth players got their chance to shine because the first-team regulars were in Mexico waiting for their Copa Sudamericana 2006 match. Tapia took full advantage of the moment and scored in Colo-Colo's surprise victory over Puerto Montt, 1–0.

In his homeland, he also played for Ñublense, Municipal Iquique, Fernández Vial, Deportes Ovalle, Trasandino and San Antonio Unido.

Personal life
After his retirement, he worked at a plastic bags factory at the same time he performed as football coach at Escuela de Fútbol Rey Palestino.

Honours

Club
Colo-Colo
 Primera División de Chile (2): 2006 Apertura, 2006 Clausura

References

External links
 BDFA profile
Tapia Picture

1988 births
Living people
Footballers from Santiago
Chilean footballers
Chile youth international footballers
Chilean Primera División players
Colo-Colo footballers
Ñublense footballers
Primera B de Chile players
Deportes Iquique footballers
C.D. Arturo Fernández Vial footballers
Tercera División de Chile players
Deportes Ovalle footballers
Trasandino footballers
San Antonio Unido footballers
Association football forwards
Chilean football managers